Emmanuel Orenday (born 19 May 1984) is a Mexican actor. Born in Aguascalientes, Mexico. He is most recognised for his portrayal of Paulino Prieto, the co-lead character on the Televisa telenovela Sin tu mirada. His first major role was in the Telemundo series El Señor de los Cielos.

Filmography

References

External links 
 

1984 births
Living people
21st-century Mexican male actors
Mexican male telenovela actors
Mexican male television actors
Mexican male film actors